Church of Saint Elijah was a Serbian Orthodox Church located in Vučitrn, the city and the seat of the eponymous municipality in Kosovo.
The church dedicated to St. Elijah was built in 1834 on the foundations of the old Orthodox church in the eastern part of Vučitrn, where the buried church items were found. The murals on the walls of the church were painted in 1871 by Blaž Damnjanović from Debar.

The destruction of the church in 1999 
The church was desecrated in June 1999 in the presence of the French KFOR troops. The priest's house was also looted and damaged. The church was set on fire once again in 2004, but in the following years it was partially restored.

References

External links 
 The list of destroyed and desecrated churches in Kosovo and Metohija June-October 1999 (Списак уништених и оскрнављених цркава на Косову и Метохији јун-октобар 1999)

Cultural heritage monuments in Vushtrri
Serbian Orthodox church buildings in Kosovo
Destroyed churches in Kosovo
Former Serbian Orthodox churches
19th-century Serbian Orthodox church buildings
1834 establishments in Europe
Cultural heritage of Kosovo
Cultural heritage monuments in Kosovska Mitrovica District
Churches in Vushtrri